Marret Glacier is a channel glacier about  wide and 4 nautical miles long, flowing northeast from the continental ice of Antarctica to the coast close east of Cape Robert. It was delineated from aerial photos taken by U.S. Navy Operation Highjump, 1946–47, and was named by the Advisory Committee on Antarctic Names for Mario Marret, the leader of the French Antarctic Expedition, 1952–53, whose party extended reconnaissance of the coastal features to the west side of Victor Bay.

See also
 List of glaciers in the Antarctic
 Glaciology

References

Glaciers of Adélie Land